Earth Defense Force is a 1991 horizontal scrolling shooter video game developed and published by Jaleco. Originally an arcade game, the game was later released for the Super Nintendo Entertainment System as Super Earth Defense Force, dropping the two-player cooperative gaming mode while adding graphics and selectable weapons. The SNES version was released in Japan on October 25, 1991, and in North America in January 1992. The SNES version was eventually released on the Wii Virtual Console in Europe on October 29, 2010, in Japan on January 11, 2011, and in North America on July 14, 2011. It is included in Nintendo Switch SNES Online as of September 5, 2019.

Gameplay 

Released as a horizontal shooter game in the US in 1991, the object of Earth Defense Force is based on survival of the game's levels, punctuated by the defeat of bosses at the end of each one. It is a fixed-length game, with a proper ending at the completion of the last level.

The player normally begins each level with three "shield" points, each able to absorb one enemy attack. The shield points are represented in the upper right corner by green squares under the heading "Shield". Additional shield points can be earned once a predetermined game score is reached. Up to five shield points are represented on screen. However, a player can acquire more than five shield points, but they cannot be seen. This is extremely rare though, due to the difficulty of the game and the score intervals at which additional shield points are acquired. Loss of all shields results in the loss of one of three credits, or continues, and loss of all continues results in the player seeing the game over screen.

The game uses a unique leveling system, in which the player gains experience from defeated enemies to gain newer, more powerful versions of the weapons the player has access to.

Plot 
The story varies slightly between the two different versions of the game.

The arcade version takes place in the equivocate future date of Earth, 20XX. The Earth is unexpectedly attacked by the mysterious Azyma Empire: a space-bound monarchy currently dedicated to eradicating all life on the planet from its flagship the Orbital Satellite Buster. The Earth's only hope lies in the recently developed XA-1 and 2 space fighter ships used by the organization known as E.D.F: Earth Defense Force.

In the Super NES version, the Azyma Empire has established headquarters on the dark side of the Moon. After attacking the Earth, it is revealed they have a secret weapon being developed on the Moon, one capable of destroying all life on Earth. The E.D.F. is ordered to send their XA-1 fighters in to drive out the invaders and destroy their ultimate weapon.

Development

Reception 
In Japan, Game Machine listed Earth Defense Force on their April 15, 1991 issue as being the eleventh most-successful table arcade unit of the month.

Since its release, Earth Defense Force has met with moderate critical reviews, as evidenced by a three out of five star rating by Allgame. Subsequent to its release an enhanced version was broadcast via the Super Famicom's Satellaview subsystem to Japanese gamers under the title BS Super Earth Defense Force.

Notes

References

External links 
 
 

1991 video games
Arcade video games
Cooperative video games
Fictional military organizations
Horizontally scrolling shooters
Jaleco games
Satellaview games
Super Nintendo Entertainment System games
Video games developed in Japan
Virtual Console games
Virtual Console games for Wii U
Science fiction video games
Video games scored by Tsukasa Tawada
Video games set in the 21st century
Nintendo Switch Online games
Nintendo Switch games
PlayStation 4 games
Hamster Corporation games
Multiplayer and single-player video games